Daisuke Miyazaki may refer to:

 Daisuke Miyazaki (filmmaker), (born 1980), a Japanese film director and screenwriter
 Daisuke Miyazaki (handballer), (born 1981), a Japanese handball player